Dioxyna chilensis is a species of tephritid or fruit flies in the genus Dioxyna of the family Tephritidae.

Distribution
Peru, Bolivia, Chile, Argentina.

References

Tephritinae
Diptera of South America
Insects described in 1843